Lapin (masculi) or Lapina (feminine) is a Russian patronymic surname . Notable people with the surname include:

Lapin 
 Aleksandr Lapin (general) (born 1964) Russian general
 Chay Lapin (born 1987), American water polo goalkeeper
 Daniel Lapin (born 1950), political commentator and American Orthodox rabbi
 David Lapin (born 1949), South African corporate advisor and rabbi
 Evgeny Lapin (born 1980), Russian ice hockey player
 Ivan Lapin (born 1988), Russian football player
 Gerri Lapin, pseudonym of Goldie Alexander (1936–2020), Australian author
 Lee Lapin (1948–2009), American author
 Leonhard Lapin (1947–2022), Estonian artist, architect and poet
 Nicole Lapin (born 1984), CNN anchor
 Nikita Lapin (born 1993), Russian footballer
 Raphael Lapin (born 1955), negotiation, mediation and communication expert
 Raymond Lapin (1919–1986), American politician
 Ron Lapin (1941–1995), American surgeon
 Sergey Lapin (police officer), Russian police officer
 Sergey Georgyevich Lapin (1912–1990), Soviet Union diplomat and politician

Lapina 
 Ginta Lapiņa (born 1989), Latvian model
 Marina Lapina (born 1981), Russian-born Azerbaijani hammer thrower
 Svetlana Lapina (born 1978), Russian high jumper

See also
Mon Lapin quotidien, formerly Lapin, a French language comic published by L'Association
 Rabbit, or lapin in French,  mammal in the family Leporidae
 Rabbit hair, or lapin, the fur of the common or Angora rabbit
 Suzuki Lapin, a Japanese car

Russian-language surnames
Jewish surnames
Patronymic surnames